At the 2002 West Asian Games. the athletics events were held in Kuwait City, Kuwait in April 2002. It had a men's only programme containing seventeen track and field events. Several athletics events usually held at multi-sport events were excluded from the schedule: the steeplechase, 10,000 metres, javelin and discus throws, marathon and race walking events were all absent.

All of the twelve countries present at the games sent athletes to compete in the athletics and eight of them reached the medal table. Qatar finished with the most medals, taking seven gold medals in a haul of sixteen. Saudi Arabia were the next best with five golds and fourteen overall, while the hosts Kuwait took third in the table through their four golds from eleven medals in total. These three countries dominated the events, with Jean-Claude Rabbath's gold for Lebanon and Ali Feizi's silver for Iran being the only top two placings among the rest of the nations.

Some of the best results came from the sprinting events: Salem Al-Yami won the 100 metres in  a Saudi Arabian record time of 10.13 seconds, while Fawzi Al-Shammari did a 200/400 metres double, breaking the Kuwaiti national record with a run of 45.25 seconds in the latter. Qatari athletes won six of the nine medals on offer in the middle- and long-distance running events. Qatar also won both of the throwing events, including Bilal Saad Mubarak's shot put victory in 19.10 metres. Saudi Arabia swept the hurdles through Mubarak Ata Mubarak and Hadi Soua'an Al-Somaily with times of 13.60 and 49.04 seconds, respectively – a good standard for the region.

A number of West Asian Games champions went on to win at the 2002 Asian Games later that year: Fawzi Al-Shammari won the 400 m, Hadi Soua'an Al-Somaily won the 400 m hurdles, Khamis Abdullah Saifeldin won the 3000 m steeplechase and Salem Al-Ahmedi won the triple jump. Further to this, West Asian silver medallists Jamal Al-Saffar and Mukhlid Al-Otaibi topped the podium at the Asian Games and Hussein Al-Sabee (third in the long jump here) was another Asian Games champion. Many athletes were also medallists at the 2002 Asian Athletics Championships held in August later that year.

Medalists

Medal table

References

External links
Official website

West Asian Games
2002
2002
2002 West Asian Games